The following is a timeline of the history of the city of Port-au-Prince, Haiti.

Prior to 19th century
 1749 – Port-au-Prince designated capital of French Saint-Domingue.
 1751 – 21 November: 1751 Port-au-Prince earthquake.
 1770 – 3 June: 1770 Port-au-Prince earthquake.
 1778 – Foundation of the theatre Comédie de Port-au-Prince.
 1783 – Freemasons lodge established.
 1791 - Haitian Revolution
 1793
 Siege of Port-au-Prince (1793)
 23 September: Town renamed "Port-Républicain".
 1794 - Battle of Port-Républicain
 1797 – Bertrand Littledale & Co. established.
 1798 – May: British forces withdraw.

19th century

 1803 – Siege of Port-au-Prince (1803)
 1804 – Haitian Declaration of Independence
 1806 – 17 October: Jean-Jacques Dessalines assassinated near town.
 1822 – December: Fire.
 1823 – Academy of Haiti opens.
 1830 – Population: 26,000 (approximate).
 1834 - Port-au-Prince Cosmorama held.
 1843 – Wesleyan primary school opens.
 1845 – Le Moniteur Haïtien newspaper begins publication.
 1848 – April: Massacre of mulattos by order of President Faustin Soulouque.
 1852 – 18 April: Coronation of Faustin Soulouque as Emperor of Haiti.
 1859 – La République newspaper begins publication.
 1860
 Le Progrès newspaper begins publication.
 Naval school established.
 1864 – Place Geffard (park) inaugurated.
 1872 - Port international de Port-au-Prince in operation.
 1881
 National Bank of Haiti established.
 National Palace (Haiti) rebuilt.
 1885 - Population: (estimated) 20,000.
 1890 – Institution Saint-Louis de Gonzague (school) founded.
 1891 – Marché en Fer established.
 1894 – L'Écho d'Haïti newspaper begins publication.
 1898 – Le Nouvelliste newspaper begins publication.
 1900 – Société Agricole et Industrielle de Port-au-Prince established.

20th century
 1907 – Le Matin newspaper begins publication.
 1908 – Sténio Vincent becomes mayor.
 1910 - Population: 61,000.(estimate).
 1915 – 28 July: United States occupation of Haiti begins.
 1918 – Violette Athletic Club (football club) formed.
 1919
 Union School Haiti founded.
 Battle of Port-au-Prince (1919)
1920
Population: 120,000 (approximate).
Battle of Port-au-Prince (1920)
 1923 – Racing Club Haïtien (football club) formed.
 1925 – La Novelle Ronde literary group formed.
 1926 – Radio station begins broadcasting.
 1928 – Cathedral of Our Lady of the Assumption, Port-au-Prince dedicated.
 1929
 Bowen airfield in operation.
 Concrete wharf constructed.
 1930 – Cercle Bellevue Club reopens (approximate date).
 1932 – Le Peuple newspaper begins publication.
 1934 – Paramount Cine opens.
 1935
 Rex Theatre opens.
 Hotel Oloffson in business.
 1940 – National Library of Haiti headquartered in city.
 1942 – University of Haiti established.
 1943 – Jazz des Jeunes dance orchestra formed.
 1944 – Centre d'Art opens.
 1945 – Institut Français established.
 1949 – Exposition internationale du bicentenaire de Port-au-Prince held.
 1950 - Population: 134,117.
 1956 – Port Administration of Port-au-Prince established.
 1960 – Jean Deeb becomes mayor.
 1965 – Duvalier International Airport opens.
 1971 - Population: 458,675 city; 493,932 urban agglomeration.
 1979 – Radio Port-au-Prince established.
 1983 - University of Port-au-Prince founded.
 1986 – March: Unrest.
 1988
 Université Caraïbe founded.
 11 September: St Jean Bosco massacre.

1990s

 1990
 Evans Paul elected mayor.
 June: Irene Ridore becomes mayor.
 Population: 690,168 (estimate).
 1991
 29 September: 1991 Haitian coup d'état.
 October: Organization of American States trade embargo begins; city economy slows.
 1993 – OAS/UN International Civilian Mission in Haiti headquartered in city.
 1994 – 19 September: United States military intervention begins.
 1995
 Manno Charlemagne becomes mayor.
 Foundation for Knowledge and Liberty headquartered in city.
 Université Notre Dame d'Haïti founded.
 1999 – Population: 990,558.

21st century

2000s
 2001 – Coup attempt at National Palace.
 2003 – Population: 704,776.
 2004
 200th anniversary of the Haitian Slave Revolution victory.
 February: 2004 Haitian coup d'état.
 29 February: United Nations Multinational Interim Force begins operating in city.
 June: United Nations Stabilization Mission in Haiti headquartered in city.
 30 September: Pro-Aristide demonstration turns violent.
 2007 – Jean Yves Jason becomes mayor.
 2008 – April: Protest against food prices.

2010s
 2010
 12 January: 2010 Haiti earthquake.
 October: Cholera outbreak begins.
 2011 – Marché en Fer restored.

See also
 Port-au-Prince history
 Timeline of Haitian history

References

This article incorporates information from the French Wikipedia.

Bibliography

in English

in French

External links

 Items related to Port au Prince, various dates (via Europeana)
  Items related to Port-au-Prince, 18th century
 Maps of Port au Prince, various dates (via University of Texas)
 Items related to Port-au-Prince, various dates (via New York Public Library)
 Materials related to Port-au-Prince, various dates (via U.S. Library of Congress, Prints & Photos Division)

.
.
Port-au-Prince
Port-au-Prince
Years in Haiti
Port-au-Prince